Arthur Richards may refer to:

 Arthur Richards, 1st Baron Milverton (1885–1978), British colonial administrator
 Arthur Richards (cricketer) (1865–1930), English cricketer
 Arthur Richards (French politician) (1890–1972), member of the French National Assembly, 1958–1967
 Arthur Shapton Richards (1877–1947), New Zealand politician of the Labour Party